Little Scrub Island is an island in Anguilla, a British Overseas Territory in the Caribbean.

Flora and fauna
The island was completely stripped of flora by Hurricane Luis in 1995 and Hurricane Lenny in 1999. Since then, the flora has recovered. Morning glory (Ipomea violaceae) and prickly pear cactus (Opuntia dillenii) are found, being vital to the Little Scrub ground lizard (Ameiva corax) which is unique to the island. 

The island provides a nesting site for various birds, including the brown noddy, bridled tern, sooty tern, roseate tern, and the brown booby. Several dove (Zenaida aurita) nests were also identified during a 2010 survey, along with a single Audubon's shearwater nest. Brown pelicans also used the island at that time, but were not observed to be nesting.

References

Islands of Anguilla